Saniya Naz (born 19 April 1988) is a Pakistani politician who had been a Member of the Provincial Assembly of Sindh, from June 2013 to May 2018.

Early life and education 
Naz was born on 19 April 1988 in Karachi.

Naz received her early education from Mir Ayub Khan Secondary School and her intermediate level education from Karachi College.

Political career

Naz was elected to the Provincial Assembly of Sindh as a candidate of Pakistan Peoples Party from Constituency PS-109 Karachi-XXI in 2013 Pakistani general election.

References

Living people
Sindh MPAs 2013–2018
Women members of the Provincial Assembly of Sindh
Pakistan People's Party politicians
1988 births
21st-century Pakistani women politicians